The 2016 Quintana Roo gubernatorial election was held on 5 June 2016. This was the first time in the state's history that the governor elected was not from the Institutional Revolutionary Party.

Results

References 

Quintana Roo
Quintana Roo
Quintana Roo gubernatorial election